Fanny Verliefden (born 29 March 1985) is a Belgian equestrian athlete and trainer. She competed at the 2018 FEI World Equestrian Games and at the European Dressage Championships in 2015 and 2019. In 2016, she was selected to represent Belgium as an individual combination at the 2016 Summer Olympics, but due to an injury of her horse Annarico, she had to withdraw.

References

1985 births
Living people
Belgian female equestrians
Belgian dressage riders
21st-century Belgian women